Kwang-chih Chang (15 April, 1931 – January 3, 2001), commonly known as K. C. Chang, was a Chinese / Taiwanese-American archaeologist and sinologist. He was the John E. Hudson Professor of archaeology at Harvard University, Vice-President of the Academia Sinica, and a curator at the Peabody Museum of Archaeology and Ethnology. He helped to bring modern, western methods of archaeology to the study of ancient Chinese history. He also introduced new discoveries in Chinese archaeology to western audiences by translating works from Chinese to English. He pioneered the study of Taiwanese archaeology, encouraged multi-disciplinal anthropological archaeological research, and urged archaeologists to conceive of East Asian prehistory (China, Korea, and Japan) as a pluralistic whole.

Early life
Chang's paternal grandfather was a farmer in Taiwan. His father, Chang Wo-chün (張我軍), moved to Beijing in 1921 to pursue his education, where he met and married Chang's mother. His father later became a professor of Japanese literature and language at Peking University and also established some fame as a leading literary figure. Born in Beijing as the second son of a family of four children, he moved to Taiwan with his family in 1946; the family's eldest son remained in mainland China. Because of that association, the 17-year-old Chang spent a year in prison during Taiwan's White Terror period.

He enrolled in National Taiwan University in 1950, where he studied anthropology and archaeology. He chose archaeology because "it is fun". He graduated in 1954 and moved to the United States to pursue his graduate studies at Harvard University. He earned his Ph.D in 1960; his dissertation was entitled Prehistoric Settlements in China: A Study in Archaeological Method and Theory.

Career
Chang began his teaching career in the Anthropology Department at Yale University and later became the chair of the department. In 1977, he returned to Harvard to chair its Department of Anthropology. He became a member of the United States National Academy of Sciences in 1979 and the John E. Hudson Professor of Archaeology at Harvard in 1984. He was a Vice-President of Taiwan's Academia Sinica from 1994 to 1996. He trained many students over the years including distinguished archaeologists such as Bruce Trigger, Richard J. Pearson, and Choi Mong-lyong.

Chang's main research interests included Chinese prehistory, archaeological theory, settlement archaeology, shamanism, Bronze Age society, and the development of and interaction between regional archaeological cultures in China.

He died in 2001 from complications due to Parkinson's disease. Most of his books of personal research are preserved in the International Center for East Asian Archaeology and Cultural History, Boston University.

Selected works
In a statistical overview derived from writings by and about Chang, OCLC/WorldCat encompasses more than 100 works in more than 200 publications in 9 languages and more than 9000 library holdings.  

 The Archaeology of Ancient China (1963), 2nd ed. (1968), 3rd ed. (1977), 4th ed. (1986)
 
 Rethinking Archaeology (1967)
 Settlement Archaeology (1968)
 Fengpitou, Tapenkeng, and the Prehistory of Taiwan (1969)
 
 Early Chinese Civilization: Anthropological Perspectives (1976)
 Food in Chinese Culture: Anthropological and Historical Perspectives (1977)
 Shang Civilization (1980)
 The Cambridge History of Ancient China: From the Origins of Civilization to 221 BC (1999)
 "The Chinese Bronze Age: A Modern Synthesis", in 
 Art, Myth and Ritual: the Path to Political Authority in Ancient China (1983)
 "The Rise of Kings and the Formation of City-states", in

Honors
 Association for Asian Studies (AAS), 1996 Award for Distinguished Contributions to Asian Studies

Notes

References

External links
 Short Biography with a link to K.C. Chang's complete bibliography

1931 births
2001 deaths
Chinese archaeologists
Chinese sinologists
Harvard University faculty
Taiwanese educators
National Taiwan University alumni
Educators from Beijing
Members of Academia Sinica
Scientists from Beijing
Harvard University alumni
Taiwanese people from Beijing
American sinologists
Chinese emigrants to the United States
Taiwanese emigrants to the United States
Neurological disease deaths in the United States
Deaths from Parkinson's disease
Yale University faculty
Members of the United States National Academy of Sciences
20th-century American archaeologists